Across the Field is the second studio album by American duo House and Land. It was released on June 14, 2019 on Thrill Jockey, and was named the Folk Album of the Month by The Guardian that month. Its release came two years after their 2017 self title debut record, and included a limited edition primrose vinyl version.

Track listing

References

2019 albums
Thrill Jockey albums